Ayşe Sultan ("The Living One" or "womanly") was an Ottoman princess, the daughter of Sultan Bayezid II. Her mother was Nigar Hatun.

Marriage
Ayşe Sultan was born in Amasya in 1465, to Bayezid II, then Şehzade and governator of the region. Her mother was the concubine Nigar Hatun, and therefore the blood sister of Şehzade Korkut and Fatma Sultan; but according to some she was instead the daughter of Bülbül Hatun, and sister of Şehzade Ahmed and Hundi Sultan. 

Ayşe married Guveyi Sinan Pasha, probably when her father was still a prince and the governor of Amasya. During Bayezid's reign, he was appointed the beylerbeyi (governor) of Anatolia. Ayşe followed him during his career in Anatolia, Gelibolu, and Rumelia. 

The two together had two sons and five daughters.

Ayşe Sultan had spent public money, while her husband, Sinan Pasha, was at war. In a letter written to her father, she complained of lack of money. However, she later had to justify herself in the eyes of her father.

After she was widowed in 1504, she returned to the capital, and her father, and later her half-brother Sultan Selim I, granted her an allowance.

Charities
In her lifetime she built a mosque in Edirne, a mescid and a school in Gelibolu to which she bequeathed her property. Sinan, her husband, received from her father villages in nahiye Üsküdar as a mülk. Consequently Sinan donated them to the mosque and kervansaray he constructed. The pasha established also a waqf at a zaviye in Gelibolu to which he bequeathed mülk villages purchased from Ayşe.

Issue
By her husband, Ayşe Sultan had two sons and five daughters:
Sultanzade Ahmed Bey, governor of Vize, married in January 1506 to the daughter of Hasan Pasha, governor of Rumelia. He had a daughter, Gevherhan Hanim.
Sultanzade Mustafa Bey. 
Hanzade Ayşe Mihrihan Hanımsultan, married in November 1503 to his cousin Sultanzade Dukakinzade Mehmed Ahmed Bey (son of Gevhermuluk Sultan), Sanjak Bey of Ankara.  She had a daughter, Mihrimah Hanim. 
Gevherşah Hanımsultan. She first married Dukakinoğlu Ahmed Pasha, with whom she had a son, Dukanginzade Ibrahim Pasha, (d. 1582, who married his cousin Neslişah Hanımsultan, daughter of Gevhermülük Sultan) and a daughter, Fatma Hanim (who in 1518 married Iskender Bey, governor of Antalya). In second marriage, she married Ibrahim Bey (son of Omer Bey and brother of her sister Mihrihan Hanımsultan's husband). They had a son, Iskender Bey, and a daughter, Hacı Rukiye Hanım. She died in Aleppo on 4 April 1552.
Kamerşah Hanımsultan, married on 6 July 1506 to Ahmed Bey, son of Ali Bey, and the grandson of Mesih Pasha, a progeny of the Palaiologos dynasty (father of her sister Fatma Hanımsultan's husband). The union was made by her mother, who was then a widow.
Fatma Hanımsultan, married on 28 June 1506 to Ali Bey, son of Mesih Pasha and father of her sister Kamerşah Hanımsultan's husband. She had a son, Ahmed Bey, who married his cousin, the daughter of Fatma Sultan.
Mihrihan Hanımsultan, married in 1505 to Hasan Bey, son of Ömer Bey and brother of her sister Gevherşah Hanımsultan's second husband, governor of Filorine.

References

Sources

1465 births
1515 deaths
15th-century Ottoman princesses
16th-century Ottoman princesses